Charlie Chan's Secret is a 1936 American mystery film directed by Gordon Wiles and starring Warner Oland, Henrietta Crosman and Rosina Lawrence. It is the tenth film in Fox's Charlie Chan series featuring Oland as the detective.

Plot 

Charlie Chan has been investigating the whereabouts of Allen Colby, heir to a vast fortune.  He recently made contact with his relations in San Francisco - his Aunt Henrietta Colby Lowell, her daughters Alice and Janice, and Janice's husband, Fred.  The story opens as Allen is traced to a ship that has sunk, but it cannot be confirmed that he is dead. On the contrary, evidence is found that someone is trying to kill him to prevent his return to San Francisco to claim the estate.

Allen arrives at Colby House and is promptly murdered. His body is revealed in the course of a seance conducted that evening at Colby House with Chan in attendance. He is an old friend of Mrs Lowell; who, like her late brother, is a devout believer in psychic research. She has retained the services of Professor Bowen and his wife, Carlotta, who is a medium. Someone subsequently attempts to kill Mrs Lowell and eventually appears to succeed. The truth is revealed in another seance, at which the murderer makes a foolish mistake.

Dramatis personae 
Warner Oland as Charlie Chan, famous Chinese-American detective from Honolulu
Jerry Miley as Allen Colby, the murdered heir, son of Bernard Colby and nephew of Henrietta Colby Lowell
Henrietta Crosman as Mrs Lowell, Allen's aunt, who is currently administering her late brother's fortune as she awaits his son's return
Rosina Lawrence as Alice Lowell, one of Henrietta Lowell's daughters, engaged to Dick Williams, lives at Lowell House with her mother
Charles Quigley as Dick Williams, Alice's fiancé, a newspaper reporter, always on the lookout for a big story
Astrid Allwyn as Janice Lowell Gage, Mrs Lowell's other daughter; she thinks her mother should be entitled to something from her late uncle's estate, regardless of Allen's claims
Edward Trevor as Fred Gage, Henrietta's son-in-law, married to Janice; he is the accountant for the estate and knows the layout of Colby House
Herbert Mundin as Mrs Lowell's butler, Baxter, who despite the butler stereotype decidedly did not do it; he provides comic relief throughout the film
Jonathan Hale as Warren Phelps, Mrs Lowell's attorney and executor of Bernard Colby's estate; he recently suffered serious losses on the stock market, and will be out of a job if Allen returns
Egon Brecher as Ulrich, the caretaker at Colby House; he has a grudge against Allen for jilting his daughter, who subsequently committed suicide
Arthur Edmund Carewe as Prof. Bowen, Mrs Lowell's advisor psychic researcher; he apparently knows of Allen Colby's death, but it is not explained how
Gloria Roy as Carlotta, Prof. Bowen's wife; she is a genuine medium although Bowen is somewhat fraudulent; but both will no longer be employed by Mrs Lowell if Allen returns
Ivan Miller as Detective Inspector Morton of the San Francisco Police, in charge of the case
William Bailey as Detective Harris
Bud Geary, Chuck Hamilton and Brick Sullivan as SFPD officers
James T. Mack as the forensic officer dusting for fingerprints
Landers Stevens as the pathologist who examines Allen Colby's body at the scene
Francis Ford as the Captain of ship salvaging the remains of the S.S. Nestor, on which Allen Colby was travelling when it sank

Production copyright
The film is the public domain due to the omission of a valid copyright notice on original prints.

See also
List of films in the public domain in the United States

External links

 
 
 
 
 

1936 films
Charlie Chan films
American black-and-white films
20th Century Fox films
Films directed by Gordon Wiles
Articles containing video clips
1936 mystery films
American mystery films
1930s English-language films
1930s American films